Pharmacovigilance (PV, or PhV), also known as drug safety, is the pharmaceutical science relating to the "collection, detection, assessment, monitoring, and prevention" of adverse effects with pharmaceutical products. As such, pharmacovigilance heavily focuses on adverse drug reactions (ADR), which are defined as any response to a drug which is noxious and unintended, including lack of efficacy (the condition that this definition only applies with the doses normally used for the prophylaxis, diagnosis or therapy of disease, or for the modification of physiological disorder function was excluded with the latest amendment of the applicable legislation). Medication errors such as overdose, and misuse and abuse of a drug as well as drug exposure during pregnancy and breastfeeding, are also of interest, even without an adverse event, because they may result in an adverse drug reaction.

Information received from patients and healthcare providers via pharmacovigilance agreements, as well as other sources such as the medical literature, plays a critical role in providing the data necessary for pharmacovigilance to take place.  In order to market or to test a pharmaceutical product in most countries, adverse event data received by the license holder (usually a pharmaceutical company) must be submitted to the local drug regulatory authority.  (See Adverse event reporting below.)

Ultimately, pharmacovigilance is concerned with identifying the hazards associated with pharmaceutical products and with minimizing the risk of any harm that may come to patients. Companies must conduct a comprehensive drug safety and pharmacovigilance audit to assess their compliance with worldwide laws, regulations, and guidance.

Terms commonly used in drug safety
Pharmacovigilance has its own unique terminology that is important to understand. Most of the following terms are used within this article and are peculiar to drug safety, although some are used by other disciplines within the pharmaceutical sciences as well.

The European Medicines Agency defines terms in its Guideline on good pharmacovigilance practices (GVP):
 Adverse drug reaction   is effects arising  when drug given even in therapeutic dose either immunologically mediated reaction or pharmacologically mediated adverse response or idiosyncratic reaction due to the peculiarities of individual. 
 Adverse event (AE) is a side effect occurring with a drug.  By definition, the causal relationship between the AE and the drug is unknown.
 Benefits are commonly expressed as the proven therapeutic good of a product but should also include the patient's subjective assessment of its effects.
 Causal relationship is said to exist when a drug is thought to have caused or contributed to the occurrence of an adverse drug reaction.
 Clinical trial (or study) refers to an organised program to determine the safety and/or efficacy of a drug (or drugs) in patients.  The design of a clinical trial will depend on the drug and the phase of its development.
 Control group is a group (or cohort) of individual patients that is used as a standard of comparison within a clinical trial.  The control group may be taking a placebo (where no active drug is given) or where a different active drug is given as a comparator.
 Dechallenge and rechallenge refer to a drug being stopped and restarted in a patient, respectively.  A positive dechallenge has occurred, for example, when an adverse event abates or resolves completely following the drug's discontinuation.  A positive rechallenge has occurred when the adverse event re-occurs after the drug is restarted.  Dechallenge and rechallenge play an important role in determining whether a causal relationship between an event and a drug exists.
 Effectiveness is the extent to which a drug works under real world circumstances, i.e., clinical practice.
 Efficacy is the extent to which a drug works under ideal circumstances, i.e., in clinical trials.
 Event refers to an adverse event.
 Harm is the nature and extent of the actual damage that could be or has been caused.
 Implied causality refers to spontaneously reported AE cases where the causality is always presumed to be positive unless the reporter states otherwise.  
 Individual Case Safety Report is an adverse event report for an individual patient.
 Life-threatening refers to an adverse event that places a patient at the immediate risk of death.
 Phase refers to the four phases of clinical research and development: I – small safety trials early on in a drug's development; II – medium-sized trials for both safety and efficacy; III – large trials, which includes key (or so-called "pivotal") trials; IV – large, post-marketing trials, typically for safety reasons.  There are also intermediate phases designated by an "a" or "b", e.g. Phase IIb.
 Risk is the probability of harm being caused, usually expressed as a percent or ratio of the treated population.
 Risk factor is an attribute of a patient that may predispose, or increase the risk, of that patient developing an event that may or may not be drug-related.  For instance, obesity is considered a risk factor for a number of different diseases and, potentially, adverse drug reactions. Others would be high blood pressure, diabetes, possessing a specific mutated gene, for example, mutations in the BRCA1 and BRCA2 genes increase propensity to develop breast cancer.
 Signal is a new safety finding within safety data that requires further investigation.  There are three categories of signals: confirmed signals where the data indicate that there is a causal relationship between the drug and the AE; refuted (or false) signals where after investigation the data indicate that no causal relationship exists; and unconfirmed signals which require further investigation (more data) such as the conducting of a post-marketing trial to study the issue.
 Temporal relationship is said to exist when an adverse event occurs when a patient is taking a given drug.  Although a temporal relationship is absolutely necessary in order to establish a causal relationship between the drug and the AE, a temporal relationship does not necessarily in and of itself prove that the event was caused by the drug.
 Triage refers to the process of placing a potential adverse event report into one of three categories: 1) non-serious case; 2) serious case; or 3) no case (minimum criteria for an AE case are not fulfilled).

Adverse event reporting

The activity that is most commonly associated with pharmacovigilance (PV), and which consumes a significant number of resources for drug regulatory authorities (or similar government agencies) and drug safety departments in pharmaceutical companies, is that of adverse event reporting. Adverse event (AE) reporting involves the receipt, triage, data entry, assessment, distribution, reporting (if appropriate), and archiving of AE data and documentation. The source of AE reports may include: spontaneous reports from healthcare professionals or patients (or other intermediaries); solicited reports from patient support programs; reports from clinical or post-marketing studies; reports from literature sources; reports from the media (including social media and websites); and reports reported to drug regulatory authorities themselves.  For pharmaceutical companies, AE reporting is a regulatory requirement in most countries. AE reporting also provides data to these companies and drug regulatory authorities that play a key role in assessing the risk-benefit profile of a given drug. The following are several facets of AE reporting:

Individual Case Safety Report 
One of the fundamental principles of adverse event reporting is the determination of what constitutes an individual case safety report.  During the triage phase of a potential adverse event report, it is important to determine if the "four elements" of a valid individual case safety report are present: (1) an identifiable patient, (2) an identifiable reporter, (3) a suspect drug, and (4) an adverse event.

If one or more of these four elements is missing, the case is not a valid individual case safety report.  Although there are no exceptions to this rule there may be circumstances that may require a judgment call.  For example, the term "identifiable" may not always be clear-cut.  If a physician reports that he/she has a patient X taking drug Y who experienced Z (an AE), but refuses to provide any specifics about patient X, the report is still a valid case even though the patient is not specifically identified.  This is because the reporter has first-hand information about the patient and is identifiable (i.e. a real person) to the physician.  Identifiability is important so as not only to prevent duplicate reporting of the same case, but also to permit follow-up for additional information.

The concept of identifiability also applies to the other three elements.  Although uncommon, it is not unheard of for fictitious adverse event "cases" to be reported to a company by an anonymous individual (or on behalf of an anonymous patient, disgruntled employee, or former employee) trying to damage the company's reputation or a company's product.  In these and all other situations, the source of the report should be ascertained (if possible).  But anonymous reporting is also important, as whistle blower protection is not granted in all countries. In general, the drug must also be specifically named. Note that in different countries and regions of the world, drugs are sold under various tradenames. In addition, there are a large number of generics which may be mistaken for the trade product. Finally, there is the problem of counterfeit drugs producing adverse events. If at all possible, it is best to try to obtain the sample which induced the adverse event, and send it to either the European Medicines Agency, FDA or other government agency responsible for investigating AE reports.

If a reporter can't recall the name of the drug they were taking when they experienced an adverse event, this would not be a valid case.  This concept also applies to adverse events.  If a patient states that they experienced "symptoms", but cannot be more specific, such a report might technically be considered valid, but will be of very limited value to the pharmacovigilance department of the company or to drug regulatory authorities.

Activities involved in pharmacovigilance
1- Case-control study (Retrospective study).
2- Prospective study (Cohort study).
3- Population statistics.
4- Intensive event report.
5- The spontaneous report in the case is the population of the single case report.

Coding of adverse events
Adverse event coding is the process by which information from an AE reporter, called the "verbatim", is coded using standardized terminology from a medical coding dictionary, such as MedDRA (the most commonly used medical coding dictionary).  The purpose of medical coding is to convert adverse event information into terminology that can be readily identified and analyzed.  For instance, Patient 1 may report that they had experienced "a very bad headache that felt like their head was being hit by a hammer" [Verbatim 1] when taking Drug X.  Or, Patient 2 may report that they had experienced a "slight, throbbing headache that occurred daily at about two in the afternoon" [Verbatim 2] while taking Drug Y.  Neither Verbatim 1 nor Verbatim 2 will exactly match a code in the MedDRA coding dictionary.  However, both quotes describe different manifestations of a headache.  As a result, in this example both quotes would be coded as PT Headache (PT = Preferred Term in MedDRA).

Seriousness determination
Although somewhat intuitive, there are a set of criteria within pharmacovigilance that are used to distinguish a serious adverse event from a non-serious one.  An adverse event is considered serious if it meets one or more of the following criteria:
results in death, or is life-threatening; 
requires inpatient hospitalization or prolongation of existing hospitalization;
results in persistent or significant disability or incapacity; 
results in a congenital anomaly (birth defect); or 
is otherwise "medically significant" (i.e., that it does not meet preceding criteria, but is considered serious because treatment/intervention would be required to prevent one of the preceding criteria.)

Aside from death, each of these categories is subject to some interpretation.  Life-threatening, as it used in the drug safety world, specifically refers to an adverse event that places the patient at an immediate risk of death, such as cardiac or respiratory arrest.  By this definition, events such as myocardial infarction, which would be hypothetically life-threatening, would not be considered life-threatening unless the patient went into cardiac arrest following the MI.  Defining what constitutes hospitalization can be problematic as well.  Although typically straightforward, it's possible for a hospitalization to occur even if the events being treated are not serious.  By the same token, serious events may be treated without hospitalization, such as the treatment of anaphylaxis may be successfully performed with epinephrine.  Significant disability and incapacity, as a concept, is also subject to debate.  While permanent disability following a stroke would no doubt be serious, would "complete blindness for 30 seconds" be considered "significant disability"?  For birth defects, the seriousness of the event is usually not in dispute so much as the attribution of the event to the drug. Finally, "medically significant events" is a category that includes events that may be always serious, or sometimes serious, but will not fulfill any of the other criteria.  Events such as cancer might always be considered serious, whereas liver disease, depending on its CTCAE (Common Terminology Criteria for Adverse Events) grade—Grades 1 or 2 are generally considered non-serious and Grades 3-5 may be considered serious.

Expedited reporting
This refers to individual case safety reports that involve a serious and unlisted event (an event not described in the drug's labeling) that is considered related to the use of the drug (US FDA).  (Spontaneous reports are typically considered to have a positive causality, whereas a clinical trial case will typically be assessed for causality by the clinical trial investigator and/or the license holder.) In most countries, the time frame for reporting expedited cases is 7/15 calendar days from the time a drug company receives notification (referred to as "Day 0") of such a case.  Within clinical trials such a case is referred to as a SUSAR (a Suspected Unexpected Serious Adverse Reaction).  If the SUSAR involves an event that is life-threatening or fatal, it may be subject to a 7-day "clock".  Cases that do not involve a serious, unlisted event may be subject to non-expedited or periodic reporting.

Clinical trial reporting
Also known as AE (adverse event) or SAE (serious AE) reporting from clinical trials, safety information from clinical studies is used to establish a drug's safety profile in humans and is a key component that drug regulatory authorities consider in the decision-making as to whether to grant or deny market authorization (market approval) for a drug. AE reporting occurs when study patients (subjects, participants) experience any kind of "untoward" event during the conducting of clinical trials. Non-serious adverse events are typically captured separately at a level lower than pharmacovigilance. AE and SAE information, which may also include relevant information from the patient's medical background, are reviewed and assessed for both causality and degree of seriousness by the study investigator. This information is forwarded to a sponsoring entity (typically a pharmaceutical company or academic medical center) that is responsible for the reporting of this information, as appropriate, to drug regulatory authorities.

Spontaneous reporting
Spontaneous reports are termed spontaneous as they take place during the clinician's normal diagnostic appraisal of a patient, when the clinician is drawing the conclusion that the drug may be implicated in the causality of the event.

Spontaneous reporting system (SRS) relies on vigilant physicians and other healthcare professionals who not only generate a suspicion of an adverse drug reaction, but also report it. It is an important source of regulatory actions such as taking a drug off the market or a label change due to safety problems. Spontaneous reporting is the core data-generating system of international pharmacovigilance, relying on healthcare professionals (and in some countries consumers) to identify and report any adverse events to their national pharmacovigilance center, health authority (such as the European Medicines Agency or FDA), or to the drug manufacturer itself. Spontaneous reports are, by definition, submitted voluntarily although under certain circumstances these reports may be encouraged, or "stimulated", by media reports or articles published in medical or scientific publications, or by product lawsuits. In many parts of the world adverse event reports are submitted electronically using a defined message standard.

One of the major weaknesses of spontaneous reporting is that of under-reporting, where, unlike in clinical trials, less than 100% of those adverse events occurring are reported.  Further complicating the assessment of adverse events, AE reporting behavior varies greatly between countries and in relation to the seriousness of the events, but in general probably less than 10% (some studies suggest less than 5%) of all adverse events that occur are actually reported.  The rule-of-thumb is that on a scale of 0 to 10, with 0 being least likely to be reported and 10 being the most likely to be reported, an uncomplicated non-serious event such as a mild headache will be closer to a "0" on this scale, whereas a life-threatening or fatal event will be closer to a "10" in terms of its likelihood of being reported.  In view of this, medical personnel may not always see AE reporting as a priority, especially if the symptoms are not serious. And even if the symptoms are serious, the symptoms may not be recognized as a possible side effect of a particular drug or combination thereof. In addition, medical personnel may not feel compelled to report events that are viewed as expected.  This is why reports from patients themselves are of high value. The confirmation of these events by a healthcare professional is typically considered to increase the value of these reports. Hence it is important not only for the patient to report the AE to his health care provider (who may neglect to report the AE), but also report the AE to both the biopharmaceutical company and the FDA, European Medicines Agency, ... This is especially important when one has obtained one's pharmaceutical from a compounding pharmacy.

As such, spontaneous reports are a crucial element in the worldwide enterprise of pharmacovigilance and form the core of the World Health Organization Database, which includes around 4.6 million reports (January 2009), growing annually by about 250,000.

Aggregate reporting
Aggregate reporting, also known as periodic reporting, plays a key role in the safety assessment of drugs.  Aggregate reporting involves the compilation of safety data for a drug over a prolonged period of time (months or years), as opposed to single-case reporting which, by definition, involves only individual AE reports.  The advantage of aggregate reporting is that it provides a broader view of the safety profile of a drug.  Worldwide, the most important aggregate report is the Periodic Safety Update Report (PSUR) and Development Safety Update Report (DSUR).  This is a document that is submitted to drug regulatory agencies in Europe, the US and Japan (ICH countries), as well as other countries around the world.  The PSUR was updated in 2012 and is now referred to in many countries as the Periodic Benefit Risk Evaluation report (PBRER).  As the title suggests, the PBRER's focus is on the benefit-risk profile of the drug, which includes a review of relevant safety data compiled for a drug product since its development.

Other reporting methods
Some countries legally oblige spontaneous reporting by physicians. In most countries, manufacturers are required to submit, through its Qualified Person for Pharmacovigilance (QPPV), all of the reports they receive from healthcare providers to the national authority. Others have intensive, focused programmes concentrating on new drugs, or on controversial drugs, or on the prescribing habits of groups of doctors, or involving pharmacists in reporting. All of these generate potentially useful information. Such intensive schemes, however, tend to be the exception. A number of countries have reporting requirements or reporting systems specific to vaccine-related events.

Risk management

Risk management is the discipline within pharmacovigilance that is responsible for signal detection and the monitoring of the risk-benefit profile of drugs.  Other key activities within the area of risk management are that of the compilation of risk management plans (RMPs) and aggregate reports such as the Periodic Safety Update Report (PSUR), Periodic Benefit-Risk Evaluation Report (PBRER), and the Development Safety Update Report (DSUR).

Causality assessment
One of the most important, and challenging, problems in pharmacovigilance is that of the determination of causality.  Causality refers to the relationship of a given adverse event to a specific drug.  Causality determination (or assessment) is often difficult because of the lack of clear-cut or reliable data.  While one may assume that a positive temporal relationship might "prove" a positive causal relationship, this is not always the case.  Indeed, a "bee sting" Adverse Event — where the AE can clearly be attributed to a specific cause — is by far the exception rather than the rule.  This is due to the complexity of human physiology as well as that of disease and illnesses.  By this reckoning, in order to determine causality between an adverse event and a drug, one must first exclude the possibility that there were other possible causes or contributing factors. If the patient is on a number of medications, it may be the combination of these drugs which causes the AE, and not any one individually. There have been a number of recent high-profile cases where the AE led to the death of an individual. The individuals were not overdosed with any one of the many medications they were taking, but the combination there appeared to cause the AE. Hence it is important to include in your/one's AE report, not only the drug being reported, but also all other drugs the patient was also taking.

For instance, if a patient were to start Drug X and then three days later were to develop an AE, one might be tempted to attribute blame Drug X.  However, before that can be done, the patient's medical history would need to be reviewed to look for possible risk factors for the AE.  In other words, did the AE occur with the drug or because of the drug?  This is because a patient on any drug may develop or be diagnosed with a condition that could not have possibly been caused by the drug.  This is especially true for diseases, such as cancer, which develop over an extended period of time, being diagnosed in a patient who has been taken a drug for a relatively short period of time.  On the other hand, certain adverse events, such as blood clots (thrombosis), can occur with certain drugs with only short-term exposure.  Nevertheless, the determination of risk factors is an important step of confirming or ruling-out a causal relationship between an event and a drug.

Often the only way to confirm the existence of a causal relationship of an event to a drug is to conduct an observational study where the incidence of the event in a patient population taking the drug is compared to a control group.  This may be necessary to determine if the background incidence of an event is less than that found in a group taking a drug.  If the incidence of an event is statistically significantly higher in the "active" group versus the placebo group (or other control group), it is possible that a causal relationship may exist to a drug, unless other confounding factors may exist.

Signal detection
Signal detection involves a range of techniques (CIOMS VIII). The WHO defines a safety signal as: "Reported information on a possible causal relationship between an adverse event and a drug, the relationship being unknown or incompletely documented previously". Usually more than a single report is required to generate a signal, depending upon the event and quality of the information available.

Data mining pharmacovigilance databases is one approach that has become increasingly popular with the availability of extensive data sources and inexpensive computing resources. The data sources (databases) may be owned by a pharmaceutical company, a drug regulatory authority, or a large healthcare provider. Individual case safety reports in these databases are retrieved and converted into structured format, and statistical methods (usually a smathematical algorithm) are applied to calculate statistical measures of association. If the statistical measure crosses an arbitrarily set threshold, a signal is declared for a given drug associated with a given adverse event. All signals deemed worthy of investigation, require further analysis using all available data in an attempt to confirm or refute the signal.  If the analysis is inconclusive, additional data may be needed such as a post-marketing observational trial.

Signal detection is an essential part of drug use and safety surveillance. Ideally, the goal of signal detection is to identify adverse drug reactions that were previously considered unexpected and to be able to provide guidance in the product's labeling as to how to minimize the risk of using the drug in a given patient population.

Risk management plans
A risk management plan is a documented plan that describes the risks (adverse drug reactions and potential adverse reactions) associated with the use of a drug and how they are being handled (warning on drug label or on packet inserts of possible side effects which if observed should cause the patient to inform/see his physician and/or pharmacist and/or the manufacturer of the drug and/or the FDA, European Medicines Agency.  The overall goal of a risk management plan is to assure a positive risk-benefit profile once the drug is (has been) marketed.  The document is required to be submitted, in a specified format, with all new market authorization requests within the European Union (EU).  Although not necessarily required, risk management plans may also be submitted in countries outside the EU.  The risks described in a risk management plan  fall into one of three categories: identified risks, potential risks, and unknown risks.  Also described within a risk management plan  are the measures that the Market Authorization Holder, usually a pharmaceutical company, will undertake to minimize the risks associated with the use of the drug.  These measures are usually focused on the product's labeling and healthcare professionals.  Indeed, the risks that are documented in a pre-authorization risk management plan will inevitably become part of the product's post-marketing labeling.  Since a drug, once authorized, may be used in ways not originally studied in clinical trials, this potential "off-label use", and its associated risks, is also described within the risk management plan.  Risk management plans can be very lengthy documents, running in some cases hundreds of pages and, in rare instances, up to a thousand pages long.

In the US, under certain circumstances, the FDA may require a company to submit a document called a Risk Evaluation and Mitigation Strategy (REMS) for a drug that has a specific risk that FDA believes requires mitigation.  While not as comprehensive as a risk management plan, a Risk Evaluation and Mitigation Strategy can require a sponsor to perform certain activities or to follow a protocol, referred to as Elements to Assure Safe Use, to assure that a positive risk-benefit profile for the drug is maintained for the circumstances under which the product is marketed.

Risk/benefit profile of drugs
Pharmaceutical companies are required by law in most countries to perform clinical trials, testing new drugs on people before they are made generally available.  This occurs after a drug has been pre-screened for toxicity, sometimes using animals for testing.  The manufacturers or their agents usually select a representative sample of patients for whom the drug is designed – at most a few thousand – along with a comparable control group. The control group may receive a placebo and/or another drug, often a so-called "gold standard" that is "best" drug marketed for the disease.

The purpose of clinical trials is to determine:
 if a drug works and how well it works
 if it has any harmful effects, and
 if it does more good than harm, and how much more? If it has a potential for harm, how probable and how serious is the harm?

Clinical trials do, in general, tell a good deal about how well a drug works. They provide information that should be reliable for larger populations with the same characteristics as the trial group – age, gender, state of health, ethnic origin, and so on though target clinical populations are typically very different from trial populations with respect to such characteristics.

The variables in a clinical trial are specified and controlled, but a clinical trial can never tell you the whole story of the effects of a drug in all situations. In fact, nothing could tell you the whole story, but a clinical trial must tell you enough; "enough" being determined by legislation and by contemporary judgements about the acceptable balance of benefit and harm.  Ultimately, when a drug is marketed it may be used in patient populations that were not studied during clinical trials (children, the elderly, pregnant women, patients with co-morbidities not found in the clinical trial population, etc.) and a different set of warnings, precautions or contraindications (where the drug should not be used at all) for the product's labeling may be necessary in order to maintain a positive risk/benefit profile in all known populations using the drug.

Pharmacoepidemiology

Pharmacoepidemiology is the study of the incidence of adverse drug reactions in patient populations using drug agents.

Pharmacogenetics and pharmacogenomics
Although often used interchangeably, there are subtle differences between the two disciplines.  Pharmacogenetics is generally regarded as the study or clinical testing of genetic variation that gives rise to differing responses to drugs, including adverse drug reactions.  It is hoped that pharmacogenetics will eventually provide information as to which genetic profiles in patients will place those patients at greatest risk, or provide the greatest benefit, for using a particular drug or drugs.  Pharmacogenomics, on the other hand, is the broader application of genomic technologies to new drug discovery and further characterization of older drugs.

International collaboration

The following organizations play a key collaborative role in the global oversight of pharmacovigilance.

The World Health Organization (WHO)
The principle of international collaboration in the field of pharmacovigilance is the basis for the WHO Programme for International Drug Monitoring, through which over 150 member nations have systems in place that encourage healthcare personnel to record and report adverse effects of drugs in their patients. These reports are assessed locally and may lead to action within the country. Since 1978, the programme has been managed by the Uppsala Monitoring Centre to which member countries send their reports to be processed, evaluated and entered into an international database called VigiBase. Membership in the WHO Programme enables a country to know if similar reports are being made elsewhere. When there are several reports of adverse reactions to a particular drug, this process may lead to the detection of a signal, and an alert about a possible hazard communicated to members countries after detailed evaluation and expert review on the biological stasis and homeostasis of the body.
Clb12/2020001

The International Council for Harmonisation (ICH)
The International Council for Harmonisation is a global organization with members from the European Union, the United States and Japan; its goal is to recommend global standards for drug companies and drug regulatory authorities around the world, with its activities overseen by the Steering Committee overseeing harmonization activities. Established in 1990, each of its six co-sponsors—the EU, the European Federation of Pharmaceutical Industries and Associations, Japan's Ministry of Health, Labor and Welfare, the Japanese Pharmaceutical Manufacturers Association, the U.S. Food and Drug Administration (FDA), and the Pharmaceutical Research and Manufacturers of America (PhRMA)—have two seats on the SC. Other parties have a significant interest in the International Council for Harmonisation and have been invited to nominate Observers to the SC; three current observers are the WHO, Health Canada, and the European Free Trade Association, with the International Federation of Pharmaceutical Manufacturers Association participating as a non-voting member of the SC.

The Council for International Organizations of Medical Science (CIOMS)
The CIOMS, a part of the WHO, is globally oriented think tank that provides guidance on drug safety related topics through its Working Groups. The CIOMS prepares reports that are used as a reference for developing future drug regulatory policy and procedures, and over the years, many of CIOMS' proposed policies have been adopted.  Examples of topics these reports have covered include: Current Challenges in Pharmacovigilance: Pragmatic Approaches (CIOMS V); Management of Safety Information from Clinical Trials (CIOMS VI); the Development Safety Update Report (DSUR): Harmonizing the Format and Content for Periodic Safety Reporting During Clinical Trials (CIOMS VII); and Practical Aspects of Signal Detection in Pharmacovigilance: Report of CIOMS Working Group (CIOMS VIII).

The International Society of Pharmacovigilance
The International Society of Pharmacovigilance is an international non-profit scientific organization, which aims to foster pharmacovigilance both scientifically and educationally, and enhance all aspects of the safe and proper use of medicines, in all countries. It was established in 1992 as the European Society of Pharmacovigilance.

Society of Pharmacovigilance, India, also established in 1992, is partner member of the International Society of Pharmacovigilance. Other local societies include the Boston Society of Pharmacovigilance Physicians.

Regulatory authorities

Drug regulatory authorities play a key role in national or regional oversight of pharmacovigilance. Some of the agencies involved are listed below (in order of 2011 spending on pharmaceuticals, from the IMS Institute for Healthcare Informatics).

United States

In the U.S., with about a third of all global 2011 pharmaceutical expenditures, the drug industry is regulated by the FDA, the largest national drug regulatory authority in the world. FDA authority is exercised through enforcement of regulations derived from legislation, as published in the U.S. Code of Federal Regulations (CFR); the principal drug safety regulations are found in 21 CFR Part 312 (IND regulations) and 21 CFR Part 314 (NDA regulations).  While those regulatory efforts address pre-marketing concerns,  pharmaceutical manufacturers and academic/non-profit organizations such as RADAR and Public Citizen do play a role in pharmacovigilance in the US. The post-legislative rule-making process of the U.S. federal government provides for significant input from both the legislative and executive branches, which also play specific, distinct roles in determining FDA policy.

Emerging economies (including Latin America)
The "pharmerging", or emerging pharmaceutical market economies, which include Brazil, India, Russia, Argentina, Egypt, Indonesia, Mexico, Pakistan, Poland, Romania, South Africa, Thailand, Turkey, Ukraine and Vietnam, accrued one fifth of global 2011 pharmaceutical expenditures; in future, aggregated data for this set will include China as well.

China's economy is anticipated to pass Japan to become second in the ranking of individual countries' in pharmaceutical purchases by 2015, and so its PV regulation will become increasing important; China's regulation of PV is through its National Center for Adverse Drug Reaction Monitoring, under China's Ministry of Health.

As JE Sackman notes, as of April 2013 "there is no Latin American equivalent of the European Medicines Agency—no common body with the power to facilitate greater consistency across countries". For simplicity, and per sources, 17 smaller economies are discussed alongside the 4 pharmemerging large economies of Argentina, Brazil, Mexico and Venezuela—Bolivia, Chile, Colombia, Costa Rica, Cuba, Dominican Republic, Ecuador, El Salvador, Guatemala, Haiti, Honduras, Nicaragua, Panama, Paraguay, Peru, Suriname, and Uruguay. As of June 2012, 16 of this total of 21 countries have systems for immediate reporting and 9 have systems for periodic reporting of adverse events for on-market agents, while 10 and 8, respectively, have systems for immediate and periodic reporting of adverse events during clinical trials; most of these have PV requirements that rank as "high or medium...in line with international standards" (ibid.). The WHO's Pan American Network for Drug Regulatory Harmonization seeks to assist Latin American countries in develop harmonized PV regulations.

Some further PV regulatory examples from the pharmerging nations are as follows. In India, the PV regulatory authority is the Indian Pharmacopoeia Commission, with a National Coordination Centre under the Pharmacovigilance Program of India, in the Ministry of Health and Family Welfare. Scientists working on pharmacovigilance share their experiences, findings, innovative ideas and researches during the annual meeting of Society of Pharmacovigilance, India. In Egypt, PV is regulated by the Egyptian Pharmacovigilance Center of the Egyptian Ministry of Health.

European Union
The EU5 (France, Germany, Italy, Spain, United Kingdom) accrued ~17% of global 2011 pharmaceutical expenditures. PV efforts in the EU are coordinated by the European Medicines Agency and are conducted by the national competent authorities (NCAs). The main responsibility of the European Medicines Agency is to maintain and develop the pharmacovigilance database consisting of all suspected serious adverse reactions to medicines observed in the European Community; the  data processing network and management system is called EudraVigilance and contains separate but similar databases of human and veterinary reactions. The European Medicines Agency requires the individual marketing authorization holders to submit all received adverse reactions in electronic form, except in exceptional circumstances; the reporting obligations of the various stakeholders are defined by EEC legislation, namely Regulation (EC) No 726/2004, and for human medicines, European Union Directive 2001/83/EC as amended and Directive 2001/20/EC.  In 2002, Heads of Medicines Agencies agreed on a mandate for an ad hoc Working Group on establishing a European risk management strategy; the Working Group considered the conduct of a high level survey of EU pharmacovigilance resources to promote the utilization of expertise and encourage collaborative working.

In conjunction with this oversight, individual countries maintain their distinct regulatory agencies with PV responsibility.  For instance, in Spain, PV is regulated by the Agencia Española de Medicamentos y Productos Sanitarios, which can suspend or withdraw the authorization of pharmaceuticals already on-market if the evidence shows that safety (or quality or efficacy) of an agent are unsatisfactory.

Rest of Europe, including non-EU

The remaining EU and non-EU countries outside the EU5 accrued ~7% of global 2011 pharmaceutical expenditures. Regulation of those outside the EU being managed by specific governmental agencies.  For instance, in Switzerland, PV "inspections" for clinical trials of medicinal products are conducted by the Swiss Agency for Therapeutic Products.

Japan

In Japan, with ~12% of all global 2011 pharmaceutical expenditures, PV matters are regulated by the Pharmaceuticals and Medical Devices Agency and the Ministry of Health, Labour, and Welfare.

Canada

In Canada, with ~2% of all global 2006 and 2011 pharmaceutical expenditures, PV is regulated by the Marketed Health Products Directorate of the Health Products and Food Branch. Canada was second, following the United States, in holding the highest total prescription drug expenditures per capita in 2011 at around 750 US dollars per person. Canada also pays such a large amount for pharmaceuticals that it was second, next to Switzerland, for the amount of money spent for a certain amount of prescription drugs (around 130 US dollars). It was also accessed that Canada was one of the top countries that increased its yearly average per capita growth on pharmaceutical expenditures the most from 2000 to 2010 with 4 percent a year (with taking inflation into account)  The Marketed Health Products Directorate mainly collects adverse drug reaction reports through a network of reporting centers to analyze and issue possible warnings to the public, and currently utilizes newsletters, advisories, adverse reaction centers, as well as electronic mailing lists. However, it does not currently maintain a database or list of drugs removed from Canada as a result of safety concerns.

In August 2017, there was a government controversy in which a bill, known as “Vanessa’s Law”, to protect patients from potentially dangerous prescription drugs was not being fully realized by hospitals; Health Canada only required hospitals to report “unexpected” negative reactions to prescription drugs, rather than any and all adverse reactions, with the justification of managing “administrative overload”.[25]

South Korea

The Republic of Korea, with ~1% of all global 2011 pharmaceutical expenditures, PV matters are regulated in South Korea by the Ministry Of Food And Drug Safety

Africa

Kenya
In Kenya, PV is regulated by the Pharmacy and Poisons Board.The Pharmacy and Poisons Board provides a Pharmacovigilance Electronic Reporting System which allows for the online reporting of suspected adverse drug reactions as well as suspected poor quality of medicinal products. The Pharmacovigilance activities in Kenya are supported by the School of Pharmacy, University of Nairobi through its Master of Pharmacy in Pharmacoepidemiology & Pharmacovigilance program offered by the Department of Pharmacology and Pharmacognosy.

In Uganda, PV is regulated by the National Drug Authority.

Rest of world

The rest of the world accrued ~7% of global 2011 pharmaceutical expenditures. Some examples of PV regulatory agencies in the rest of the world are as follows. In Iraq, PV is regulated by the Iraqi Pharmacovigilance Center of the Iraqi Ministry of Health.

In India: Pv is regulated by the PVPI (Pharmacovigilance programme of India)

Pharmacoenvironmentology (Ecopharmacovigilance)
Despite attention from the FDA and regulatory agencies of the European Union, procedures for monitoring drug concentrations and adverse effects in the environment are lacking. Pharmaceuticals, their metabolites, and related substances may enter the environment after patient excretion, after direct release to waste streams during manufacturing or administration, or via terrestrial deposits (e.g., from waste sludges or leachates). A concept combining pharmacovigilance and environmental pharmacology, intended to focus attention on this area, was introduced first as pharmacoenvironmentology in 2006 by Syed Ziaur Rahman and later as ecopharmacology with further concurrent and later terms for the same concept (ecopharmacovigilance, environmental pharmacology, ecopharmacostewardship).

The first of these routes to the environment, elimination through living organisms subsequent to pharmacotherapy, is suggested as the principal source of environmental contamination (apart from cases where norms for treatment of manufacturing and other wastes are violated), and ecopharmacovigilance is intended to deal specifically with this impact of pharmacological agents on the environment.

Activities of ecopharmacovigilance have been suggested to include:
Increasing, generally, the availability of environmental data on medicinal products;
Tracking emerging data on environmental exposure, effects and risks after product launch;
Using environmental risk management plans to manage risk throughout a drug's life cycle;
Following risk identification, promoting further research and environmental monitoring, and
In general, promoting a global perspective on ecopharmacovigilance issues.

Related to medical devices

A medical device is an instrument, apparatus, implant, in vitro reagent, or similar or related article that is used to diagnose, prevent, or treat disease or other conditions, and does not achieve its purposes through chemical action within or on the body (which would make it a drug).  Whereas medicinal products (also called pharmaceuticals) achieve their principal action by pharmacological, metabolic or immunological means, medical devices act by physical, mechanical, or thermal means.  Medical devices vary greatly in complexity and application.  Examples range from simple devices such as tongue depressors, medical thermometers, and disposable gloves to advanced devices such as medical robots, cardiac pacemakers, and neuroprosthetics. This modern concept of monitoring and safety of medical devices which is known materiovigilance was quite documented in Unani System of medicine.

Given the inherent difference between medicinal products and medical products, the vigilance of medical devices is also different from that of medicinal products.  To reflect this difference, a classification system has been adopted in some countries to stratify the risk of failure with the different classes of devices.  The classes of devices typically run on a 1-3 or 1-4 scale, with Class 1 being the least likely to cause significant harm with device failure versus Classes 3 or 4 being the most likely to cause significant harm with device failure.  An example of a device in the "low risk" category would be contact lenses.  An example of a device in the "high risk" category would be cardiac pacemakers.

Medical device reporting (MDR), which is the reporting of adverse events with medical devices, is similar to that with medicinal products, although there are differences. In contrast to reporting of medical products reports of side-effects play only a minor role with most medical devices. The vast majority of the medical device reports are related to medical device defects or failures. Other notable differences are in the obligations to report by other actors that aren't manufacturers, in the US user-facilities such as hospitals and nursing homes are legally required to report suspected medical device-related deaths to both FDA and the manufacturer, if known, and serious injuries to the manufacturer or to FDA, if the manufacturer is unknown.  This is in contrast to the voluntary reporting of AEs with medicinal products. Similar obligations exist in multiple European countries. The European regulation on medical devices and the European regulation on in vitro diagnostic medical devices (IVDR) obliges other economic operators most notably importers and distributors to inform manufacturers, and in certain instances the authorities, of incidents and safety issues with medical devices that they have distributed or imported in the European market.

For herbal medicines

The safety of herbal medicines has become a major concern to both national health authorities and the general public. The use of herbs as traditional medicines continues to expand rapidly across the world; many people now take herbal medicines or herbal products for their health care in different national health-care settings. However, mass media reports of adverse events with herbal medicines can be incomplete and therefore misleading. Moreover, it can be difficult to identify the causes of herbal medicine-associated adverse events since the amount of data on each event is generally less than for pharmaceuticals formally regulated as drugs (since the requirements for adverse event reporting are either non-existent or are less stringent for herbal supplements and medications).

Novel sources 
With the emergence of advanced artificial intelligence methods and social media big data, researchers are now using publicly posted social media data to discover unknown side effects of prescription medications. Natural language processing and machine learning methods are developed and used for identifying non-standard expressions of side effects.

Industry associations

Boston Society of Pharmacovigilance Physicians.

See also 

Adverse drug reaction
Adverse effect (medicine)
Boston Collaborative Drug Surveillance Program
Consultant pharmacist
COSTART – Coding Symbols for a Thesaurus of Adverse Reaction Terms
DrugLogic
European Medicines Agency
EudraVigilance
Food and Drug Administration (US FDA)
International Society for Pharmacoepidemiology
International Society of Pharmacovigilance
List of withdrawn drugs
Society of Pharmacovigilance, India (SoPI)
MedDRA – Medical Dictionary for Regulatory Activities
Medical device
MedWatch
National Drug & Safety League
Public health
Pharmacoepidemiology
Pharmacotherapy
Pharmacogenetics
Pharmacogenomics
Pharmaceuticals and personal care products in the environment
Post-market surveillance
Proportional reporting ratio
Uppsala Monitoring Centre
WHOART
Yellow Card Scheme (UK)
Black triangle (pharmacovigilance)

References

Further reading

External links 

Clinical research
Clinical trials
 
Health care quality
Pharmaceuticals policy